NGC 1342 is an open cluster  in the constellation Perseus. It was discovered by William Herschel on 28 December 1799. It is located in the south of the constellation, almost halfway between Algol (β Persei) and ζ Persei, away from the plane of the Milky Way. NGC 1342 has an apparent size of 17' and an apparent magnitude of 6.7, marginally visible by naked eye. In 1994, Peña, J. H. and Peniche, R. estimated by the use of photometric data, that the age of the cluster is 400 million years.

References

External links 
 

1342
Perseus (constellation)
Open clusters